LZH may refer to:

 Classical Chinese (ISO 639: lzh), a written form of Old Chinese
 LHA (file format), a data compression format
 Liuzhou Bailian Airport (IATA code: LZH), an airport in China